Salangapalayam is a panchayat town in Erode district in the Indian state of Tamil Nadu.

Demographics
 India census, Salangapalayam had a population of 14,456. Males constitute 50% of the population and females 50%. Salangapalayam has an average literacy rate of 54%, lower than the national average of 59.5%: male literacy is 65%, and female literacy is 43%. In Salangapalayam, 9% of the population is under 6 years of age.

Schools

There are two schools in this area, a government school which goes up to 10th standard and a private school which goes up to 5th standard.

Textiles

Some textile shops are also available in this location. They provide high quality clothes with concessional rates. It is located exactly opposite to government board office.

Gandhi Temple
There is a temple constructed for Gandhi in Senthampalayam village which comes under Salangapalayam panchayat, this temple is follows the Hindu temple architecture. The main deity of this temple is Mahatma Gandhi and deity of Kasturbai is also worshiped.

References

Cities and towns in Erode district